The  or  ("Stone of Fál") is a stone at the Inauguration Mound on the Hill of Tara in County Meath, Ireland, which served as the coronation stone for the King of Tara and hence High King of Ireland. It is also known as the Stone of Destiny or  Speaking Stone. According to legend, all of the kings of Ireland were crowned on the stone up to Muirchertach mac Ercae, .

Mythical origin
The Lebor Gabala, dating to the eleventh century, states that it was brought in antiquity by the semi-divine race known as the Tuatha Dé Danann. The  had travelled to the "Northern Isles" where they learned many skills and magic in its four cities Falias, Gorias, Murias and Findias. From there they travelled to Ireland bringing with them a treasure from each city – the four legendary treasures of Ireland.

Some Scottish chroniclers, such as John of Fordun and Hector Boece from the thirteenth century, treat the  the same as the Stone of Scone in Scotland. According to this account, the  left Tara in AD 500 when the High King of Ireland Murtagh MacEirc loaned it to his great-uncle, Fergus (later known as Fergus the Great) for the latter's coronation in Scotland. Fergus's sub-kingdom, Dalriada, had by this time expanded to include the north-east part of Ulster and parts of western Scotland. Not long after Fergus's coronation in Scotland, he and his inner circle were caught in a freak storm off the County Antrim coast in which all perished. The stone remained in Scotland, which is why Murtagh MacEirc is recorded in history as the last Irish King to be crowned on it.

However, historian William Forbes Skene commented: "It is somewhat remarkable that while the Scottish legend brings the stone at Scone from Ireland, the Irish legend brings the stone at Tara from Scotland."

The , recording a tradition from early Irish literature and echoing ancient legends, reports that Lia Fáil would roar in the presence of a false king pretending to hold dominion in Ireland.

According to one version of Gaelic Myth surrounding the  stone, a myth more associated with the Stone of Scone, the sacred stone arrived by ship belonging to the Iberian Danaan into the ancient port of Carrickfergus about 580 BC. On board was Eochaidh, son of a High King and a descendant of Érimón, Princess Tea Tephi and the scribe Simon Brauch. Princess Tea also had in her possession an ancient harp, whose origins some believe lie in the House of David. The stone was delivered to the Hill of Tara by the three. Scota later married High King Eochaidh, both had previously met each other in Jerusalem. Eochaidh recovered the ancient stone in Jerusalem before the invasion of the Babylonians. It is said all future Irish High Kings/British Monarchs inaugurated by the stone have tried to prove lineage back to the Royal Sage and his wife, Tea Tephi, the original bearers of the stone. Eochaidh's resting place is said to be in the Neolithic passage tomb, Cairn T at Loughcrew.

Mythical powers
The  was thought to be magical: when the rightful High King of Ireland put his feet on it, the stone was said to roar in joy. The stone is also credited with the power to rejuvenate the king and also to endow him with a long reign.

The stone was originally called Fál, a word of obscure meaning; the Dictionary of the Irish Language distinguishes the word from five homonyms in Old Irish and Middle Irish, which have respective meanings "barrier", "chieftain", "abundance", "learning", and "valley". It is from this stone the  metonymically named Ireland ' ("island of Fál"), and from this  became an ancient name for Ireland.

The  [warrior-band] of the Fenian Cycle, though usually simply "the Fianna", was sometimes poetically called  "Fianna of Ireland". In  ["The Soldier's Song"], the republic's national anthem, the opening "Soldiers are We" is translated "". For similar reasons, Fianna Fáil is the name of a major political party in the republic. The identification of the Lia Fáil with the Scottish "Stone of Destiny" has fostered the misapprehension that "Fá[i]l" means "[of] Destiny", and hence  is rendered "Soldiers of Destiny".

 Vandalism 
Sometime in June 2012, the stone was vandalised. The stone was damaged in 11 places by a hammer. It was vandalised again in May 2014 when green and red paint was poured on the stone covering at least 50% of its surface.

The stone was vandalised again on 6–7 February 2023 when the word "Fake" was spray painted on the 5,000-year-old granite stone.Vandalism of Hill of Tara standing stone a ‘desecration’ The Irish Times, 2023-02-07.

See also
 Stone of Scone – the "Stone of Destiny" for coronation of Scottish, English, and British monarchs
 Stones of Mora – where the Swedish kings were elected
 Prince's Stone – where the princes of Carantania and dukes of Carinthia were installed
 Sword in the stone (King Arthur) – which also revealed the rightful king
 Blarney Stone – a tourist attraction said to endow those kissing it with the "gift of the gab"

References

Further reading
FitzPatrick, Elizabeth. Royal Inauguration in Gaelic Ireland c. 1100–1600. Woodbridge, 2004.
Nitze, William A. "The Siege Perilleux and the Lia Fáil or 'Stone of Destiny'." Speculum 31 (1956): 258 ff.
Ó Broin, Tomás. "Lia Fáil: fact and fiction in tradition." Celtica'' 21 (1990): 393–401.
Bondarenko, Grigory. "Lia Fáil and other stones: symbols of power in Ireland and their origins".

External links 
The History of Ireland, Geoffrey Keating, pp. 205–212
The Legend of Tephi, visitsydneyaustralia

Archaeological sites in County Meath
Coronation stones
Irish mythology
Irish words and phrases
Megalithic monuments in Ireland
Sovereignty
Tuatha Dé Danann
Names for Ireland